

H

H: (1990 & 2002)
H. (2014)
H. G. Wells' The Shape of Things to Come (1979)
H. G. Wells' The War of the Worlds (2005)
H. M. Pulham, Esq. (1941)
H.M.S. Defiant (1962)
The H-Man (1958)
H.O.T.S. (1979)
H2O: (1929 & 2004)
H8RZ (2015)

Ha

Ha da venì... don Calogero! (1952)
Ha fatto tredici (1951)
Ha! Ha! Ha! (1934)
Ha'penny Breeze (1950)

Haa–Hab

Haal E Kangaal (2014)
Haalu Jenu (1982)
Haami (2018)
Haan (2005) 
Haan Maine Bhi Pyaar Kiya (2002)
Haani (2013)
Haar Jeet: (1940, 1972 & 2016)
Haasil (2003)
Haata Dhari Chaaluthaa (2013)
Haatchhani (2012)
Haath Ki Safai (1974)
Haathi Ke Daant (1973)
Haathi Mere Saathi: (1971 & 1993)
Haathkadi: (1982 & 1995)
Haathon Ki Lakeeren (1986)
Haatim Tai (1990)
Hababam Sınıfı (1975)
Hababam Sınıfı Sınıfta Kaldı (1975)
Hababam Sınıfı Tatilde (1977)
Habana Blues (2005)
Habana Eva (2010)
Habanastation (2011)
Habeas Corpus (1928)
Haber (2008)
Habermann (2010)
Había una vez un circo (1972)
Habibie & Ainun (2012)
Habit: (1921, 1997 & 2021)
Habitat (1997)
Habla, mudita (1973)
Habu Chandra Raja Gobu Chandra Montri (2021)

Hac-Haj

Hachi: A Dog's Tale (2009)
Hachiko Monogatari (1987)
Hackers (1995)
Hacks: (1997 & 2002)
Hacksaw Ridge (2016)
Hadh Kar Di Aapne (2000)
Hag in a Black Leather Jacket (1964)
Hagazussa (2017)
Haggard: The Movie (2003)
Hagiga B'Snuker (1975)
Hai Apna Dil Toh Awara (2016)
Hai Golmaal In White House (2013)
Hai Hai Nayaka (1989)
Hai Hui Babi Achchi (2001)
Hai Master (2007)
Hai Meri Jaan (1991)
Haikara-san ga Tōru (1987)
Haiku Tunnel (2001)
Hail Caesar (1994)
Hail Columbia (1982)
Hail the Conquering Hero (1944)
Hail the Judge (1994)
Hail Mary (1985)
Hail Satan? (2019)
Hail the Woman (1921)
Hail, Caesar! (2016)
El Haimoune (1984)
La Haine (1995)
Hair (1979)
Hair High (2004)
Hair Love (2019)
Hair-Raising Hare (1946)
The Hairdresser's Husband (1990)
Hairshirt (1998)
Hairspray: (1988 & 2007)
The Hairy Ape (1944)
The Hairy Bird (1998)
Hajen som visste för mycket (1989)

Hal

Hal: (2013 & 2018)
Halber Mensch (1986)
Hale County This Morning, This Evening (2018)
Half Angel: (1936 & 1951)
Half Baked (1998)
Half Breed (1914)
Half Brothers (2020)
Half a Confession (2004)
Half a Dozen Babies (1999 TV)
Half Empty Saddles (1958)
Half Girlfriend (2017)
Half Human (1955)
Half Light (2006)
Half Life: A Parable for the Nuclear Age (1985)
Half a Loaf of Kung Fu (1978)
Half Magic (2018)
Half Marriage (1929)
Half Nelson (2006)
Half Past Dead (2002)
Half-A-Dollar-Bill (1924)
The Half-Breed (1952)
Half-Caste (2004)
Half-Cocked (1994)
Half-Fare Hare (1956)
Half-Life (2008)
Half-Rate Honeymoon (1936)
Half-Wits Holiday (1947)
The Halfway House (1944)
Halik sa Hangin (2015)
Halim (2006)
Halka (1937)
Halkaa (2018)
Hall of Mirrors (2001)
Hall Pass (2011)
Hallam Foe (2006)
The Hallelujah Trail (1965)
Hallelujah (1929)
Hallelujah the Hills (1963)
Hallelujah, I'm a Bum (1933)
Hallo (2007)
Hallowed Ground (2007)
Halloween series:
Halloween: (1978, 2007 & 2018)
Halloween II: (1981 & 2009)
Halloween III: Season of the Witch (1982)
Halloween 4: The Return of Michael Myers (1988)
Halloween 5: The Revenge of Michael Myers (1989)
Halloween: The Curse of Michael Myers (1995)
Halloween H20: 20 Years Later (1998)
Halloween: Resurrection (2002)
Halloween Kills (2021)
Halloween Ends (2022)
Halloween Is Grinch Night (1977)
Halloween with the New Addams Family (1977 TV)
Halloween Night (2006)
The Halloween Tree (1993 TV)
Halloweentown series:
Halloweentown (1998 TV)
Halloweentown II: Kalabar's Revenge (2001 TV)
Halloweentown High (2004 TV)
Return to Halloweentown (2006 TV)
Halls of Montezuma (1950)
Hallucination Generation (1967)
Halo (1996)

Ham

Ham & Cheese (2004)
Ham and Eggs (1933)
Ham and Eggs at the Front (1927)
Ham on Rye (2019)
Hamam (1997)
Hamara Desh (1941)
Hamara Dil Aapke Paas Hai (2000)
Hamara Ghar: (1950 & 1964)
Hamara Sansar (1978)
Hamare Tumhare (1979)
Hamari Adhuri Kahani (2015)
Hamari Baat (1943)
Hamari Bahu Alka (1982)
Hamari Betiyan (1936)
Hamari Paltan (2018)
Hamari Yaad Aayegi (1961)
Hambone and Hillie (1983)
Hamburger Hill (1987)
Hamburger: The Motion Picture (1986)
Hameer (2017)
Hamid (2018)
Hamilton: (1998, 2006 & 2020)
Hamilton: In the Interest of the Nation (2012)
The Hamiltons (2006)
Hamlet: (1900, 1907, 1908, 1912, 1913, 1917, 1948, 1959 TV, 1961, 1964, 1969, 1990, 1996, 2000, 2009 TV & 2011)
Hamlet 2 (2008)
Hamlet A.D.D. (2014)
Hamlet: The Drama of Vengeance (1921)
Hammerboy (2004)
Hammers Over the Anvil (1991)
Hammett (1982)
Hampstead (2017)

Han

Hana (2006)
Hana-bi (1997)
Hanagatami (2017)
Hancock (2008)
The Hand: (1960, 1965 & 1981)
The Hand of the Artist (1906)
The Hand of God (2021)
The Hand That Rocks the Cradle: (1917 & 1992)
"#HandoZenryoku" (2020)
A Handful of Heroes (1967)
Handle with Care: (1932, 1935, 1958, 1977 & 1985 TV)
Handling Ships (1945)
The Handmaid's Tale (1990)
The Handmaiden (2016)
Hands Across the Table (1935)
The Hands of Orlac: (1924 & 1960)
Hands over the City (1963)
Hands of the Ripper (1971)
Hang 'Em High (1968)
Hangar 18 (1980)
Hanging Garden (2005)
The Hanging Garden (1997)
The Hanging Tree (1959)
Hanging Up (2000)
Hangman: (2015 & 2017)
The Hangman: (1928, 1959 & 2005)
Hangmen Also Die! (1943)
The Hangover series:
The Hangover (2009)
The Hangover Part II (2011)
The Hangover Part III (2013)
Hangover Square (1945)
Hangup (1974)
Hanna (2011)
Hanna D. - The Girl from Vondel Park (1984)
Hanna's War (1988)
Hannah: (1997 & 2017)
Hannah Arendt (2012)
Hannah med H (2003)
Hannah and Her Brothers (2001)
Hannah and Her Sisters (1986)
Hannah Montana and Miley Cyrus: Best of Both Worlds Concert (2008)
Hannah Montana: The Movie (2009)
Hannah Takes the Stairs (2007)
Hannele's Journey to Heaven (1922)
Hanneles Himmelfahrt (1934)
Hannerl and Her Lovers: (1921 & 1936)
Hannibal: (1959, 2001 & 2006 TV)
Hannibal Rising (2007)
Hannie Caulder (1971)
Hanover Street (1979)
Hans Christian Andersen (1952)
Hans Christian Andersen's The Little Mermaid (1975)
Hans in Every Street (1930)
Hans onsdagsveninde (1943)
Hansa (2012)
Hansel and Gretel: (1954 Janssen, 1954 Genschow, 1983 TV, 2002, 2007 & 2013)
Hansel & Gretel Get Baked (2013)
Hansel and Gretel: An Opera Fantasy (1954)
Hansel & Gretel: Witch Hunters (2013)
Hansel vs. Gretel (2015)
Hanson and the Beast (2017)
Hanste Aansoo (1950)
Hanste Khelte: (1984 & 1994)
Hanste Zakhm (1973)
Hansuli Banker Upakatha (1962)
Hanthakana Sanchu (1980)
Hantu Gangster (2012)
Hantu Jeruk Purut (2006)
Hantu Kak Limah (2018)
Hanuman (2005)
Hanussen: (1955 & 1988)

Hap–Haq

Happening (2021)
The Happening: (1967 & 2008)
Happenstance (2000)
Happi (2019)
Happidrome (1943)
The Happiest Day in the Life of Olli Mäki (2016)
The Happiest Days of Your Life (1950)
The Happiest Millionaire (1967)
Happiest Season (2020)
Happily (2021)
Happily Ever After: (1985, 1990, 2004 & 2009)
Happily Mixed Up (2014)
Happily N'Ever After (2007)
Happily N'Ever After 2: Snow White—Another Bite @ the Apple (2009)
Happiness: (1917, 1924, 1935, 1957, 1998, 2007, 2013 & 2016)
Happiness Ahead: (1928 & 1934)
Happiness C.O.D. (1935)
Happiness Comes at Nine o'Clock (1961)
Happiness Costs Nothing (2003)
Happiness Is (2009)
Happiness Is Coming (2018)
Happiness Is in the Field (1995)
Happiness Is a Four-letter Word (2016)
Happiness Is Loving Your Teacher (1977)
Happiness Is the Main Thing (1941)
Happiness Is... Part 2 (2019)
The Happiness of the Katakuris (2002)
Happiness a la Mode (1919)
Happiness Never Comes Alone (2012)
Happiness Runs (2010)
Happiness of Three Women (1917)
The Happiness of Three Women (1954)
Happiness for Two (1940)
Happiness is a Warm Gun (2002)
HappinessCharge PreCure! the Movie: The Ballerina of the Land of Dolls (2014)
Happy: (1933, 2006, 2011 & 2015)
Happy Accidents (2000)
Happy Birthday: (1998, 2002, 2009, 2016 American & 2016 Indian)
Happy Birthday to Me (1981)
Happy Birthday, Wanda June (1971)
Happy Campers (2001)
Happy Death Day (2017)
Happy Death Day 2U (2019)
Happy End: (1967, 1999, 2003, 2009 & 2017)
Happy Endings (2005)
Happy Ero Christmas (2003)
Happy Feet (2006)
Happy Feet Two (2011)
Happy Gilmore (1996)
Happy Hardy and Heer (2020)
The Happy Hooker Goes to Washington (1977)
Happy Landing: (1934 & 1938)
Happy Little Submarines 4: Adventure of Octopus (2014)
Happy Little Submarine Magic Box of Time (2015)
Happy New Year, Colin Burstead (2018)
The Happy Prince: (1974 & 2018)
Happy Times: (2000 & 2014)
Happy Together: (1989 American, 1989 Hong Kong, 1997 & 2018)
Happy Tree Friends (2012)
Happy-Go-Lucky (2008)
Happy, Happy (2010)
Happy, Texas (1999)
"#Happy420" (2021)
Happythankyoumoreplease (2010)
Haq (2010)

Har

Har Dil Jo Pyar Karega (2000)
Hara (2014)
Hara-Kiri: Death of a Samurai (2011)
Harakiri: (1919 & 1962)
Hard to Be a God (2013)
Hard Boiled (1992)
Hard Candy (2005)
Hard Core Logo (1996)
A Hard Day's Night (1964)
Hard Eight (1996)
Hard Kill (2020)
Hard to Kill (1990)
Hard Luck: (1921 & 2006)
Hard Luck Love Song (2021)
Hard Men (1996)
Hard Rain (1998)
Hard Rock Zombies (1985)
Hard Target (1993)
Hard Ticket to Hawaii (1987)
Hard Times: (1915, 1975 & 1988)
The Hard Way: (1943 & 1991)
Hardball (2001)
Hardbodies (1984)
Hardbodies 2 (1986)
Hardcore: (1977 & 1979)
The Harder They Come (1972)
The Harder They Fall: (1956 & 2021)
Hardly a Criminal (1949)
Hardly Working (1981)
Hardware (1990)
Hardware Wars (1977)
Hare Brush (1955)
The Hare Census (1973)
Hare Force (1944)
Hare Trigger (1945)
Hare-um Scare-um (1939)
Hari (2018)
Harka (2022)
Harlan County, USA (1976)
Harlem (1943)
Harlem Nights (1989)
Harlequin (1980)
Harley Davidson and the Marlboro Man (1991)
Harlot: (1964 & 1971)
Harlow: (Magma 1965 & Paramount 1965)
Harmful Insect (2002)
The Harmonium in My Memory (1999)
Harmony (2015)
Harm’s Way (2018)
Harold (2008)
Harold & Kumar series:
Harold & Kumar Go to White Castle (2004)
Harold & Kumar Escape from Guantanamo Bay (2008)
A Very Harold & Kumar Christmas (2011)
Harold and the Purple Crayon (2023)
Harold and Maude (1971)
Harper (1966)
Harriet (2019)
Harriet the Spy (1996)
Harrison's Flowers (2001)
Harry Brown (2009)
Harry Chapin: When in Doubt, Do Something (2020)
Harry and the Hendersons (1987)
Harry Potter series:
Harry Potter and the Philosopher's Stone (2001)
Harry Potter and the Chamber of Secrets (2002)
Harry Potter and the Prisoner of Azkaban (2004)
Harry Potter and the Goblet of Fire (2005)
Harry Potter and the Order of the Phoenix (2007)
Harry Potter and the Half-Blood Prince (2009)
Harry Potter and the Deathly Hallows – Part 1 (2010)
Harry Potter and the Deathly Hallows – Part 2 (2011)
Harry and Tonto (1974)
Harry and Walter Go to New York (1976)
Harsh Times (2005)
Hart's War (2002)
Haru (1996)
Harum Scarum (1965)
Haruta & Chika (2017)
Harvard Beats Yale 29-29 (2008)
Harvard Man (2001)
Harvard, Here I Come (1941)
Harvest: (1936, 1937 & 1967)
Harvest of Empire: A History of Latinos in America (2012)
Harvest of Fire (1996 TV)
Harvest Gold (1945)
Harvest of Hate (1978 TV)
Harvest Home: (1995 & 2009)
Harvest Melody (1943)
Harvest Time (2004)
Harvest: 3,000 Years (1976)
Harvey: (1950 & 1996 TV)
The Harvey Girls (1946)
Harvie Krumpet (2003)

Has-Haz

Has Anybody Seen My Gal? (1952)
Has God Forsaken Africa? (2008)
Has the World Gone Mad! (1923)
Hasan Minhaj: Homecoming King (2017)
Haseena (2018)
Haseena Atom Bomb (1990)
Haseena Maan Jaayegi (1999)
Haseena Maan Jayegi (1968)
Haseena Parkar (2017)
Haseenon Ka Devata (1971)
Hasemann's Daughters (1920)
Hashtag Horror (2015)
Hashish, the Paradise of Hell (1921)
Hasida Hebbuli (1983)
Hasina (2004)
Hasina: A Daughter's Tale (2018)
Hasina Aur Nagina (1996)
Hasina Dacait (2001)
Hason Raja: (2002 & 2017)
Hatari! (1962)
Hatchet series:
Hatchet (2006)
Hatchet II (2010)
Hatchet III (2013)
Victor Crowley (2017)
Hatchet for the Honeymoon (1970)
Hatching (2022)
Hated: GG Allin and the Murder Junkies (1994)
The Hateful Eight (2015)
Hating Alison Ashley (2005)
Hatred (1975)
Hats Off: (1927, 1936 & 2008)
Hatsukoi Jigokuhen (1968)
Hatter's Castle (1942)
The Hatter's Ghost (1982)
The Hatton Garden Job (2017)
Haunt (2018)
Haunted: (1995, 2007 & 2012)
The Haunted (1991)
Haunted – 3D (2011)
Haunted Castle (2001)
The Haunted Castle: (1897 British, 1897 French, 1921 & 1960)
The Haunted Cinema (2014)
Haunted Honeymoon (1986)
The Haunted Honeymoon (1925)
The Haunted Hotel (1907)
Haunted House: (1940 & 2004)
A Haunted House (2013)
The Haunted House: (1913, 1921, 1928, 1929 & 2005)
A Haunted House 2 (2014)
The Haunted House of Horror (1969)
Haunted Lighthouse (2003)
Haunted Mansion: (1998, 2015 & 2023)
The Haunted Mansion (2003)
The Haunted Palace (1963)
Haunted Road (2014)
The Haunted Strangler (1958)
Haunted Summer (1988)
A Haunted Turkish Bathhouse (1975)
The Haunted World of El Superbeasto (2009)
The Haunting: (1963 & 1999)
The Haunting in Connecticut (2009)
The Haunting in Connecticut 2: Ghosts of Georgia (2013)
Haunting Me (2007)
The Haunting of Molly Hartley (2008)
The Haunting of Sharon Tate (2019)
Hauser's Memory (1970 TV)
Haute Tension (2005)
À Hauteur d'homme (2003)
Hav Plenty (1997)
Have a Good Funeral, My Friend... Sartana Will Pay (1970)
Have Rocket, Will Travel (1959)
Haven (2006)
Haven’t We Met Before? (2002)
Havoc: (1972 & 2005)
Le Havre (2011)
Hawaii: (1966 & 2013)
The Hawaiians (1970)
The Hawk: (1931, 1935 & 1993)
Hawk the Slayer (1980)
Hawking: (2004 TV & 2013)
Hawks (1988)
The Hawks and the Sparrows (1966)
Hawmps! (1976)
Häxan (1922)
Hayride to Hell (1995)
Haywire: (1980 TV & 2011)
Hazaaron Khwaishen Aisi (2005)
Haze: (2005 & 2010)

He

He (2012)
He Died with a Felafel in His Hand (2001)
He Got Game (1998)
He Knows You're Alone (1980)
He Loves Me... He Loves Me Not (2002)
He Named Me Malala (2015)
He Never Died (2015)
He Ran All the Way (1951)
He Said, She Said (1991)
He Walked by Night (1948)
He Was a Quiet Man (2007)
He Who Gets Slapped (1924)
He Who Must Die (1957)
He's All That (2021)
He's Just Not That Into You (2009)
He's Way More Famous Than You (2013)
He's a Woman, She's a Man (1994)

Hea

Head (1968)
Head Above Water (1997)
Head in the Clouds (2004)
Head Count (2018)
Head Games (2012)
The Head Hunter (2018)
Head Office (1985)
Head of State (2003)
Head On: (1980 & 1998)
Head-On (2004)
 Head Over Heels: (1922, 1937, 1979 & 2001)
Headhunters (2011)
Heading South (2005)
The Headless Horseman: (1922 & 1973)
The Headsman (2005)
Healers for All Reasons (2005)
Health (1980)
Hear My Song (1991)
The Hearse (1980)
The Heart of the Bear (2001)
Heart Blackened (2017)
The Heart Breaker (1925)
Hearts of Darkness: A Filmmaker's Apocalypse (1991)
The Heart Is Deceitful Above All Things (2004)
Heart of Dixie (1989)
Heart of a Dog (1988)
Heart of Dragon (1985)
The Heart of the Game (2006)
Heart of Glass (1976)
Heart for Heaven (2015)
The Heart Is a Lonely Hunter (1968) 
Heart Shot (2022)
Heart and Souls (1993)
The Heart's Cry (1994)
Heartaches (1981)
The Heart Breaker (1925)
The Heartbreak Kid: (1972, 1993 & 2007)
Heartbreak Ridge (1986)
Heartbreaker: (1983 & 2010)
Heartbreakers: (1984 & 2001)
Heartburn (1986)
Heartfall Arises (2016)
Heartland (1979)
Heartless: (1995, 2005, 2009 & 2014)
The Hearts of Age (1934)
Hearts in Atlantis (2001)
Hearts of Darkness: A Filmmaker's Apocalypse (1991)
Hearts in Dixie (1929)
Hearts and Minds (1974)
Hearts of the World (1918)
Heartthrob (2017)
Heartworn Highways (1981)
 Heat: (1963, 1972, 1986, 1995 & 2006)
The Heat (2013)
Heat and Dust (1983)
Heat Team (2004)
Heathers (1988)
Heatwave (1982)
Heaven: (1987 & 2002)
Heaven with a Barbed Wire Fence (1939)
Heaven Can Wait: (1943 & 1978)
Heaven and Earth: (1990 & 1993)
Heaven and Earth Magic (1957)
Heaven Is a Playground (1991)
Heaven Is for Real (2014)
Heaven Knows What (2014)
Heaven Knows, Mr. Allison (1957)
Heaven Only Knows (1947)
Heaven's Burning (1998)
Heaven's Gate (1980)
Heaven's Prisoners (1996)
Heaven's Story (2010)
Heavenly Creatures (1994)
Heavens Above! (1963)
Heavy (1995)
The Heavy (2010)
Heavy Metal (1981)
Heavy Metal 2000 (2000)
Heavy Metal Parking Lot (1986)
Heavy Petting: (1989 & 2007)
Heavy Traffic (1973)
Heavyweights (1995)

Heb-Hej

Hebbet Ramakka (2018)
Hebe: A Estrela do Brasil (2019)
The Hebrew Hammer (2004)
The Heck with Hollywood! (1991)
Heckler (2007)
The Heckler (1940)
The Heckling Hare (1941)
Hectic Knife (2016)
Hector: (1987 & 2015)
Hector the Mighty (1972)
Hector and the Search for Happiness (2014)
Hector's Bunyip (1986 TV)
Hedd Wyn (1992)
Hedda (1975)
Hedda Gabler: (1920, 1925, 1961 & 2016)
Hedgehog (2017)
The Hedgehog (2009)
Hedgehog in the Fog (1975)
Hedgehog's Home (2017)
Hedi (2016)
Hedi Schneider Is Stuck (2015)
Hedwig and the Angry Inch (2001)
Heebee Jeebees (1927)
Heebie Jeebies (2013 TV)
Heegondhu Dina (2018)
Heena Hoyana Samanallu (2017)
Heer (1955)
Heer and Hero (2013)
Heer Maan Ja (2019)
Heer Raanjha (1970)
Heer Ranjha: (1932, 1970 & 1992)
Heer Sial: (1938 & 1965)
Heera (1973)
Heera Aur Pathar (1964)
Heera-Moti (1979)
Heera Panna (1973)
Heeralaal Pannalal (1978)
Heeralal Pannalal (1999)
Heeron Ka Chor (1982)
Hefner: Unauthorized (1999 TV)
Hegel's Angel (2018)
Hei de Vencer (1924)
A Heidelberg Romance (1951)
Heidi: (1937, 1952, 1965, 1968, 2005 animated, 2005 live-action & 2015)
Heidi 4 Paws (2008)
The Heidi Chronicles (1995)
Heidi Fleiss: Hollywood Madam (1995)
Heidi's Song (1982)
The Heifer (1985)
The Height (1957)
Height of the Wave (2019)
Heights (2004)
Heiko (2008)
Heimat: (1938 & 1984)
Heimat Bells (1952)
The Heineken Kidnapping (2011)
Heintje: A Heart Goes on a Journey (1969)
Heinz in the Moon (1934)
The Heir of the Ages (1917)
The Heir to the Hoorah (1916)
The Heir to Næsbygaard (1965)
Heir to Trouble (1935)
The Heiress (1949)
The Heiress at Coffee Dan's (1916)
The Heiress of the Count of Monte Cristo (1919)
The Heiresses: (1980 & 2018)
The Heirloom Mystery (1936)
The Heirs (2008)
The Heirs of Uncle James (1924)
Heist: (2001 & 2015)
The Heist: (1970, 1976, 1989 TV, 2001 & 2008)
The Heist of the Country (2020)
A Heist with Markiplier (2019)
Heist: Who Stole the American Dream? (2011)
Heiter bis Wolkig (2012)
Heißer Sommer (1968)
Heja Roland! (1966)

Hel

Held to Answer (1923)
Held for Damages (1916)
Held by the Enemy (1920)
Held Hostage (2009)
Held In Trust (1920)
Held by the Law (1927)
Held einer Nacht (1935) 
Held for Ransom: (1938 & 2000)
Held Up (1999)
Held Up for the Makin's (1920)
Heldenkampf in Schnee und Eis (1917)
Helen: (2009 & 2019)
Helen the Baby Fox (2006)
Helen of Four Gates (1920)
Helen Keller in Her Story (1954)
Helen of Troy (1956)
Helen's Babies (1924)
Helena (1924)
Helena from the Wedding (2010)
Helga – Vom Werden des menschlichen Lebens (1967)
Heli (2013)
Helicopter Canada (1966)
Helicopter Eela (2018)
Helicopter Mom (2014)
Heliopolis (2009)
Helios (2015)
Heliotrope (1920)
Helium (2014)
Hell Comes to Frogtown (1988)
Hell Divers (1931)
Hell Drivers (1957)
Hell Fest (2018)
Hell on Frisco Bay (1955)
Hell is Full (2010)
Hell Hath No Fury (1991 TV)
Hell Is for Heroes (1962)
Hell or High Water (2016)
Hell of the Living Dead (1980)
Hell Night (1981)
Hell in the Pacific (1969)
Hell Ride (2007)
Hell's Angels (1930)
Hell's Angels '69 (1969)
Hell's Belles (1969)
Hell's Bells (1929)
Hell's Bloody Devils (1970)
Hell's Cargo (1939)
Hell's Crater (1918)
Hell's Crossroads (1957)
Hell's Hinges (1916)
Hell-Bent for Election (1944)
Hell Bent (1918)
Hellbent (2004)
Hellblazers (2022)
Hellboy series:
Hellboy: (2004 & 2019)
Hellboy: Sword of Storms (2006 TV)
Hellboy: Blood and Iron (2007 TV)
Hellboy 2: The Golden Army (2008)
The Hellcats (1968)
Hellcats of the Navy (1957)
Hellfighters (1968)
Hellions (2015)
Hello Again: (1987 & 2017)
Hello God (1951)
Hello Herman (2013)
Hello I Must Be Going: (2012 & 2014)
Hello, Dolly! (1969)
Hello, My Dolly Girlfriend (2013)
Hello, My Name Is Doris (2016)
Hellraiser series:
Hellraiser (1987)
Hellbound: Hellraiser II (1988)
Hellraiser III: Hell on Earth (1992)
Hellraiser: Bloodline (1996)
Hellraiser: Inferno (2000)
Hellraiser: Hellseeker (2002)
Hellraiser: Deader (2005)
Hellraiser: Hellworld (2005)
Hellraiser: Revelations (2011)
Hellraiser: Judgment (2018)
Hells Angels on Wheels (1967)
The Hellstrom Chronicle (1971)
Hellzapoppin' (1941)
The Help (2011)
Help! (1965)
Helter Skelter: (1949, 1976 TV & 2004 TV)
Helvetica (2007)

Hem-Hey

Hem från Babylon (1941)
Hema Hema (2016)
Hema Hemeelu (1979)
Hemanta (2016)
Hemantharaathri (1978)
Hemareddy Mallamma (1946)
Hemavathi (1977)
Hemavin Kadhalargal (1985)
Hemel (2012)
Hemingway & Gellhorn (2012)
Hemingway's Adventures of a Young Man (1962)
Hemlock Hoax, the Detective (1910)
Hemlock Society (2012)
Hemp for Victory (1942)
Hen: (Chicken, 2004)
A Hen in the Wind (1948)
Henry Fool (1997)
Henry & June (1990)
Henry Poole Is Here (2008)
Henry V: (1944, 1989 & 2012 TV)
Henry VIII (1911)
Henry VIII and His Six Wives (1972)
Henry: Portrait of a Serial Killer (1986)
Henry's Crime (2011)
Hentai Kamen (2013)
Hentai Kamen: Abnormal Crisis (2016)
Her (2013)
Her Alibi (1989)
Her Deadly Reflections (2019)
Her Love Boils Bathwater (2016)
Her Name Was Christa (2020)
Her Penalty (1921)
Her Smell (2018)
Hera Pheri: (1976 & 2000)
Herb (2007)
Herbie series:
Herbie Goes Bananas (1980)
Herbie Goes to Monte Carlo (1977)
Herbie Rides Again (1974)
Herbie: Fully Loaded (2005)
The Love Bug (1969)
Hercules: (1958, 1983, 1997 & 2014)
Hercules Against the Moon Men (1965)
Hercules in the Haunted World (1961)
Hercules and the Masked Rider (1963)
Hercules in New York (1970)
Hercules Unchained (1959)
The Herdsman (1982)
Here Before (2021)
Here Come the Munsters (1995 TV) 
Here Comes the Boom (2012)
Here Comes Happiness (1941)
Here Comes Mr. Jordan (1941)
Here Comes the Navy (1934)
Here Comes Peter Cottontail (1971 TV)
Here on Earth (2000)
Here We Go Round the Mulberry Bush (1967)
Here Alone (2016)
Here Are the Young Men (2020)
Here Is Your Life (1966)
Hereafter (2010)
Hereditary (2018)
Her Friend the Bandit (1914)
Hero: (1982, 1983, 1984, 1985, 1987, 1992, 1997, 2002, 2006, 2012, 2015 Hindi & 2015 Japanese)
The Hero: (1917, 1923, 1966, 2004 & 2017)
The Hero of the Dardanelles (1915)
Hero of the Red-Light District (1960)
Hero and the Terror (1988)
Hero – Beyond the Boundary of Time (1993)
A Hero's Life (1994)
Heroes: (1977 & 2008)
Heroes of the East (1978)
Heroes of the Eastern Skies (1977)
Heroes Join Forces (2015 TV)
Heroes for Sale (1933)
The Heroes of Telemark (1965)
Heroes of the West: (1932 & 1963)
The Heroic Trio (1993)
Herself (2020)
Hesher (2010)
The Hessen Affair (2009)
The Hessian Renegades (1909)
Hester Street (1975)
Hex: (1973 & 2015)
Hexed (1993)
The Hexer (2001)
Hey Arnold!: The Jungle Movie (2017 TV)
Hey Arnold!: The Movie (2002)
Hey Babe! (1980)
Hey Good Lookin' (1982)
Hey Ram (2000)
Hey There, It's Yogi Bear! (1964)
Hey, Stop Stabbing Me! (2003)

Hi

Hi, Beautiful (1944)
Hi, Buddy (1943)
Hi Cousin! (1996)
Hi! Dharma! (2001)
Hi! Dharma 2: Showdown in Seoul (2004)
Hi Diddle Diddle (1943)
Hi, Fidelity (2011)
Hi Gang! (1941)
Hi I'm Tony (2014)
Hi, Mom (2021)
Hi, Mom! (1970)
Hi, Neighbor (1942)
Hi Nellie! (1934)
Hi no Tori (1978)
Hi'ya, Chum (1943)
Hi'ya, Sailor (1943)
Hi-De-Ho (1947)
Hi-Ho Mistahey! (2013)
Hi-Jacked (1950)
Hi-Life (1998)
The Hi-Line (1999)
The Hi-Lo Country (1999)
Hi-Riders (1978)
Hi-Rise Wise Guys (1970)
Hi-Tops (1985)
Hi-Yo Silver (1940)
Hi'-Neighbor! (1934)

Hia-Hiv

Hiawatha's Rabbit Hunt (1941)
Hibi Rock (2014)
Hick (2011)
Hidalgo (2004)
Hidden: (2009 & 2015)
The Hidden (1987)
Hidden Agenda: (1990 & 2001)
The Hidden Blade (2004)
Hidden City (1987)
The Hidden City (2018)
The Hidden Face (2011)
Hidden Figures (2016)
The Hidden Fortress (1958)
Hidden Fuhrer: Debating the Enigma of Hitler's Sexuality (2004)
Hidden Kisses (2016) (TV)
A Hidden Life: (2001 & 2019)
Hidden in Plain Sight (2019)
Hidden Intentions (2018)
Hidden War (2000)
Hide and Seek (2005)
Hide-Out (1934)
Hideaway (1995)
Hideous Kinky (1998)
Hiding Out (1987)
Hieronymus Bosch, Touched by the Devil (2015)
High Anxiety (1977)
High Art (1998)
High Crimes (2002)
High Desert Kill (1989) (TV)
High Diving Hare (1949)
High Fidelity (2000)
High Freakquency (1998)
High Heat (2022)
High Heels and Low Lifes (2001)
High Hopes (1988)
High Kick Angels (2014)
High Lane (2009)
High&Low The Movie (2016)
High and Low (1963)
The High and the Mighty (1954)
High Noon: (1952, 2009 & 2013)
High Noon, Part II: The Return of Will Kane
The High Note (2020)
High Plains Drifter (1973)
High Road to China (1983)
High Roller: The Stu Ungar Story (2003)
High School: (1940, 1954, 1968 & 2010)
High School Confidential (1958)
High School High (1996)
High School Musical series:
High School Musical (2006) (TV)
High School Musical 2 (2007) (TV)
High School Musical 3: Senior Year (2008)
High Schools (1984)
High Sierra (1941)
High Society: (1924, 1955, 1956 & 2014)
High Spirits (1988)
High Tension (1936 & 2003)
High Tide: (1947 & 1987)
High Time (1960)
High Treason: (1929 British, 1929 German & 1951)
High Velocity (1976)
High Voltage: (1929, 1981 & 1997)
High Wall (1947)
A High Wind in Jamaica (1965)
High-Rise (2015)
Highball (1997)
Higher Ground (2011)
Higher Learning (1995)
Highlander series:
Highlander (1986)
Highlander II: The Quickening (1991)
Highlander III: The Sorcerer (1994)
Highlander: Endgame (2000)
Highlander: The Search for Vengeance (2007)
Highlander: The Source (2007)
Highway: (2002 & 2014)
Highway 301 (1950)
Highway 61 (1991)
Highway Dragnet (1954)
Highway to Hell (1992)
Highway Patrolman (1991)
The Highwayman (1951)
Highwaymen (2004)
The Highwaymen (2019)
Hijacking Catastrophe: 9/11, Fear & the Selling of American Empire (2004)
Hilary and Jackie (1998)
Hilde Warren und der Tod (1917)
Hiljaisuus (2011)
The Hill (1965)
Hill of Freedom (2014)
A Hill in Korea (1956)
Hillary (2020)
Hillary's America: The Secret History of the Democratic Party (2016)
Hillbilly Elegy (2020)
Hillbilly Hare (1950)
The Hills Have Eyes series:
The Hills Have Eyes: (1977 & 2006)
The Hills Have Eyes 2 (2007)
The Hills Have Eyes Part II (1985)
The Hills Run Red: (1966 & 2009)
Hillside Cannibals (2006)
Him (1974)
Himalaya (1999)
Himalaya: Ladder to Paradise (2015)
Himitsu (1999)
The Hindenburg (1975)
Hindenburg Disaster Newsreel Footage (1937)
Hinterland: (1998, 2015 & 2021)
Hintertreppe (1921)
The Hippopotamus (2017)
The Hired Hand (1971)
Hired! (1940)
The Hireling (1973)
Hiroshima: (1953 & 1995)
Hiroshima Mon Amour (1959)
Hiruko the Goblin (1991)
Hirunaka no Ryūsei (2017)
Hirune Hime: Shiranai Watashi no Monogatari (2017)
His Girl Friday (1940)
His House (2020)
His House in Order: (1920 & 1928)
His Kind of Woman (1951)
His Last Gift (2008)
His Majesty O'Keefe (1954)
His Majesty, the Scarecrow of Oz (1914)
His Motorbike, Her Island (1986)
His New Profession (1914)
Histoires extraordinaires (1968)
The History Boys (2006)
History Is Made at Night (1937)
History of Postwar Japan as Told by a Bar Hostess (1970)
A History of Violence (2005)
History of the World, Part I (1981)
The Hit (1984)
Hit the Deck: (1930 & 1955)
Hit the Ice (1943)
Hit the Road: (1941 & 2021)
Hit and Run: (1924, 1957, 2009 & 2012)
Hitch (2005)
Hitch Hike Lady (1935)
The Hitch-Hiker (1953)
Hitchcock (2012)
Hitchcock/Truffaut (2015)
The Hitcher: (1986 & 2007)
The Hitcher II: I've Been Waiting (2003)
The Hitchhiker's Guide to the Galaxy (2005)
Hitler: (1962, 1996, 1997 & 1998)
Hitler – Beast of Berlin (1939)
Hitler: A Film from Germany (1977)
Hitler: The Last Ten Days (1973)
Hitler: The Rise of Evil (2003) (TV)
Hitler's British Girl (2007) (TV)
Hitler's Reign of Terror (1934)
Hitman: (1997, 1998, 2007 & 2014)
Hitman: Agent 47 (2015)
The Hitman's Bodyguard (2017)
Hitman's Wife's Bodyguard (2021)
Hive (2021)
The Hive: (2008 TV & 2014)
Hives (2012)

Ho

Hoa–Hoo

The Hoax (2007)
The Hobbit: (1977 & 1985)
The Hobbit series
The Hobbit: An Unexpected Journey (2012)
The Hobbit: The Desolation of Smaug (2013)
The Hobbit: The Battle of the Five Armies (2014)
Hobbs & Shaw (2019)
Hobgoblins (1988)
Hobgoblins 2 (2009)
Hobo with a Shotgun (2011)
Hobson's Choice: (1920, 1931 &  1954)
Hockey Homicide (1945)
Hocus Pocus (1993)
Hocus Pocus 2 (2022)
Hocuspocus: (1930, 1953 & 1966)
Hokuriku Proxy War (1977)
Hokus Pokus (1949)
Hoffa (1992)
Hoffman (1970)
The Holcroft Covenant (1985)
Hold Back the Dawn (1941)
Hold Back Tomorrow (1955)
Hold the Dark (2018)
Hold Everything (1930)
Hold the Lion, Please (1942)
Hold Me Tight: (1933 & 2010)
Hold That Ghost (1941)
Hold You Tight (1998)
Hold Your Fire (2021)
Holding the Man (2015)
The Hole: (1957, 1960, 1962, 1997, 1998, 2001 & 2009)
The Hole in the Ground (2019)
A Hole in the Head (1959)
A Hole in My Heart (2004)
A Hole of My Own Making (1955)
A Hole in the Wall: (1930, 1950 & 1982)
The Hole in the Wall: (1921 & 1929)
Holes (2003)
The Holes (1974)
Holidate (2020)
Holiday: (1930 & 1938)
The Holiday (2006)
Holiday Affair (1949)
Holiday Hell (2019)
Holiday for Henrietta (1952)
Holiday Inn (1942)
Holiday in the Sun (2001)
The Hollars (2016)
Hollow: (2011 & 2014)
Hollow Man (2000)
Hollow Man 2 (2006)
Hollow Triumph (1948)
Holly Hobbie and Friends: Surprise Party (2006)
The Holly and the Ivy (1952)
Hollywood or Bust (1956)
Hollywood Canteen (1944)
Hollywood Chainsaw Hookers (1988)
Hollywood Ending (2002)
Hollywood Heartbreakers (1985)
Hollywood Homicide (2003)
The Hollywood Knights (1980)
The Hollywood Revue of 1929 (1929)
Hollywood Shuffle (1987)
Hollywood Stargirl (2022)
Hollywoodland (2006)
Hols: Prince of the Sun (1968)
Holy Ghost (2014)
Holy Ghost People: (1967 & 2013)
Holy Man (1998)
Holy Motors (2012)
The Holy Mountain: (1926 & 1973)
Holy Rollers (2010)
Holy Smoke! (1999)
Holy Spider (2022)
Hombre (1967)
Home: (1915, 2003 TV, 2006, 2008 American, 2008 Swiss, 2009, 2011, 2012, 2015, 2016 American, 2016 Belgian, 2016 British & 2021)
Home Again: (2012 & 2017)
Home Alone series:
Home Alone (1990)
Home Alone 2: Lost in New York (1992)
Home Alone 3 (1997)
Home Alone 4: Taking Back the House (2002) (TV)
Home Alone: The Holiday Heist (2012) (TV)
Home Sweet Home Alone (2021)
Home Before Midnight (1979)
Home of the Brave: (1986, 2004 & 2006)
A Home at the End of the World (2004)
Home Fries (1998)
Home of the Giants (2006)
Home from the Hill (1960)
Home for the Holidays: (1972 & 1995)
Home from Home: (1939 & 2013)
Home Movie: (2008 & 2016)
Home on the Range: (1935, 1946 & 2004)
A Home on the Range (2002)
Home Room (2003)
Home Run (2013)
Home Team: (1998 & 2022)
Home is Where the Killer Is (2019)
Homebodies (1974)
Homeboy (1988)
Homecoming: (1928, 1941, 1948, 1996 TV, 2009 & 2021)
The Homecoming (1973)
The Homecoming of Odysseus: (1918 & 1922)
Homefront (2013)
Homegrown (1998)
Homeland (2014)
Homeland: Iraq Year Zero (2015)
The Homeless (1974)
The Homeless Student (2008)
Homerun (2003)
The Homesman (2014)
Homeward Bound: The Incredible Journey (1993)
Homeward Bound II: Lost in San Francisco (1996)
Homicidal (1961)
Homicide: (1949 & 1991)
Homicide: The Movie (2000) (TV)
L'Homme du large (1920)
L'homme du train (2002)
L'Homme qui aimait les femmes (1977)
L'Homme de Rio (1964)
Hondo (1954)
An Honest Liar (2014)
Honey: (1981, 2003 & 2010)
Honey Night (2015)
Honey, I Shrunk the Kids series:
Honey, I Shrunk the Kids (1989)
Honey, I Blew Up the Kid (1992)
Honey, I Shrunk the Audience (1994)
Honey, We Shrunk Ourselves (1997)
Honeybaby, Honeybaby (1974)
Honeymoon: (1928 American, 1928 German, 1941, 1947, 1956, 1959, 1973, 1974, 1985, 2013 & 2014)
Honeymoon Hotel: (1934 & 1964)
The Honeymoon Killers (1970)
Honeymoon in Vegas (1992)
The Honeymooners (2005)
Honeysuckle Rose (1980)
The Honeytrap (2002)
Honig im Kopf (2014)
Honk for Jesus. Save Your Soul. (2022)
Honky Tonk Freeway (1981)
Honnōji Hotel (2017)
Honolulu (1936)
Honor of the Knights (2006)
The Honorary Consul (1983)
Hood of Horror (2006)
Hoodlum (1997)
The Hoodlum Saint (1946)
The Hoodlum Soldier (1965)
Hoodwinked! (2005)
Hoodwinked Too! Hood vs. Evil (2011)
A Hoof Here, a Hoof There (1989)
Hook (1991)
Hoop Dreams (1994)
Hooper (1978)
Hoosiers (1986)
Hoot (2006)

Hop–Hot

Hop (2011)
Hop Harrigan (1946)
Hop, Look and Listen (1948)
Hopalong Casualty (1960)
Hope: (1997 TV, 2006, 2007, 2011, 2013, 2014 & 2019)
Hope Floats (1998)
Hope and Glory (1987)
Hope and Pain (1988)
Hope Springs: (2003 & 2012)
Hopscotch (1980)
The Horde (2012)
The Horn Blows at Midnight (1945)
Horns (2013)
Horrible Bosses (2011)
Horrible Bosses 2 (2014)
Horrid Henry: The Movie (2011)
Horrific (2000)
Horror (2002)
The Horror Crowd (2020)
Horror Express (1973)
Horror Hotel (1960)
Horror Noire: A History of Black Horror (2019)
The Horror of Party Beach (1964)
Horror of the Zombies (1976)
Horrors of the Black Museum (1959)
Horrors of Malformed Men (1969)
Horse Feathers (1932)
Horse Girl (2020)
Horse Money (2014)
The Horse Soldiers (1959)
The Horse Thief (1986)
The Horse Whisperer (1998)
The Horse's Mouth (1958)
Horsemen (2009)
Horsey (1997)
Horton Hears a Who! (2008)
Hospital (1970) (TV)
The Hospital (1971)
Hospital Massacre (1982)
Hospitals Don't Burn Down! (1978)
Host (2020)
The Host: (2006, 2013 & 2020) 
Hostage: (1974, 1983 & 2005)
The Hostage: (1917, 1956 & 1967)
Hostage House (2021)
Hostage: Missing Celebrity (2021)
Hostel (2006)
Hostel: Part II (2007)
Hostel: Part III (2011)
Hostile Advances (1996) (TV) 
Hostile Waters (1997) (TV)
Hostiles (2017)
Hot Blood Band (2015)
The Hot Chick (2002)
Hot Cross Bunny (1948)
Hot Dog…The Movie (1984)
Hot Fuzz (2007)
Hot Pursuit (2015)
The Hot Rock (1972)
Hot Rod: (1950, 1979 TV & 2007)
Hot Rods to Hell (1967)
Hot Saturday (1932)
Hot Shots! (1991)
Hot Shots! Part Deux (1993)
The Hot Spot (1990)
Hot Summer Night (1957)
Hot Summer Nights (2017)
Hot to Trot (1988)
Hot Tub Time Machine (2010)
Hot Tub Time Machine 2 (2015)
Hot Water: (1924 & 1937)
Hot Wheels: World Race (2003)
Hotel: (1967, 2001 & 2004)
Hotel Angel (1974)
The Hotel of the Dead (1921)
Hotel for Dogs (2009)
Hotel du Lac (1986) (TV)
Hotel Mumbai (2019)
The Hotel New Hampshire (1984)
Hôtel du Nord (1938)
Hotel Paradis (1931)
Hotel Paradiso (1966)
Hotel by the River (2018)
Hotel Rwanda (2004)
Hotel Transylvania series:
Hotel Transylvania (2012)
Hotel Transylvania 2 (2015)
Hotel Transylvania 3: Summer Vacation (2018)
Hotel Transylvania: Transformania (2022)
The Hottest State (2006)
The Hottie and the Nottie (2008)

Hou

Houdini (1953)
The Hound of the Baskervilles: (1921, 1929, 1932, 1937, 1939, 1959, 1972 TV, 1978, 1981 TV, 1983 TV, 2000 TV & 2002 TV)
Hounds of Love (2016)
The Hour of the Furnaces (1968)
Hour of the Gun (1968)
Hour of the Wolf (1968)
The Hours (2002)
The Hours and Times (1991)
House: (1977, 1995 & 2008)
House series:
House (1986)
House II: The Second Story (1987)
House III: The Horror Show (1989)
House IV (1992)
The House: (1975, 1983, 1997, 1999, 2011, 2013, 2017 & 2022)
House of 1000 Corpses (2003)
House of 9 (2005)
The House on 92nd Street (1945)
The House Across the Bay (1940)
The House Across the Lake (1954)
The House Across the Street (1949)
House Arrest (1996)
House of Bamboo (1955)
The House Bunny (2008)
House of Cards: (1943, 1968 & 1993)
The House on Carroll Street (1988)
The House by the Cemetery (1984)
The House with a Clock in Its Walls (2018)
House of D (2005)
House of Dark Shadows (1970)
House of Darkness: (1948 & 2022)
The House of Darkness (1913)
House of the Dead (2003)
House of the Dead 2 (2006) (TV)
The House of the Devil: (1896 & 2009)
House of Dracula (1945)
The House on the Edge of the Park (1980)
House at the End of the Street (2012)
The House of Fear (1945)
House of Flying Daggers (2004)
House of Fools (2002)
House of Frankenstein (1944)
House of Games (1987)
The House on Garibaldi Street (1979) (TV)
The House of Ghosts (1908)
House of Gucci (2021)
House on Haunted Hill: (1959 & 1999)
 House on the Hill (2012)
House of Hummingbird (2018)
 House by the Lake (2017)
The House I Live In: (1945, 1957 & 2012)
The House with Laughing Windows (1976)
House of the Long Shadows (1983)
The House of the Lost Court (1915)
The House in the Middle (1954)
The House of Mirth: (1918, 1981 TV & 2000)
The House of Molitor (1922)
House Party series:
House Party (1990)
House Party 2 (1991)
House Party 3 (1994)
House Party 4: Down to the Last Minute (2001)
House of Pleasure: (1952 & 1969)
House by the River (1950)
The House of Rothschild (1934)
The House of Sand (2006)
House of Sand and Fog (2003)
The House of the Seven Gables (1940)
The House on Sorority Row (1982)
The House of the Spaniard (1936)
The House of the Spirits (1993)
House of Strangers (1949)
House of Terror: (1960 & 1973)
The House That Dripped Blood (1971)
The House That Jack Built: (1900, 1967 & 2018)
The House That Vanished (1973)
The House That Would Not Die (1970) (TV)
House of Tolerance (2011)
House of Usher (1960)
House of Wax: (1953 & 2005)
House on Willow Street (2016)
 House of the Witch (2017)
The House of Yes (1997)
House! (2000)
Houseboat (1958)
Houseboat Horror (1989)
Housebound (2014)
Housefull 2 (2012)
Houseguest (1995)
Household X (2011)
Housekeeping (1988)
The Housemaid: (1960, 2010 & 2016)
Housesitter (1992)

How-Hoz

How to Be a Latin Lover (2017)
How to Be a Player (1997)
How to Be Single (2016)
How to Beat the High Cost of Living (1980)
How to Build a Better Boy (2014)
How to Build a Girl (2019)
How to Deal (2003)
How to Deter a Robber (2020)
How Do You Know (2010)
How to Eat Fried Worms (2006)
How to Get Ahead in Advertising (1989)
How Green Was My Valley (1941)
How the Grinch Stole Christmas: (1966 TV & 2000)
How High (2001)
How I Got Into College (1989)
How I Killed My Father (2001)
How I Won the War (1967)
How to Irritate People (1968) (TV)
How It Ends: (2018 & 2021)
How to Kill Your Neighbor's Dog (2000)
How the Lack of Love Affects Two Men (2006)
How to Lose Friends & Alienate People (2008)
How to Lose a Guy in 10 Days (2003)
How to Make an American Quilt (1995)
How to Make the Cruelest Month (1998)
How to Make a Monster: (1958 & 2001 TV)
How to Marry a Millionaire (1953)
How a Mosquito Operates (1912)
How Much Wood Would a Woodchuck Chuck (1976)
How to Murder Your Wife (1965)
How to Play Baseball (1942)
How to Save a Marriage and Ruin Your Life (1968)
How She Move (2008)
How the Sith Stole Christmas (2002)
How to Steal a Million (1966)
How Stella Got Her Groove Back (1998)
How to Stuff a Wild Bikini (1965)
How to Succeed in Business Without Really Trying (1967)
How to Survive a Plague (2012)
How to Swim: (1942 & 2018)
How to Train Your Dragon series:
How to Train Your Dragon (2010)
How to Train Your Dragon 2 (2014)
How to Train Your Dragon 3 (2019)
How the West Was Won (1962)
Howard the Duck (1986)
Howard Lovecraft and the Frozen Kingdom (2016)
Howards End (1992)
The Howards of Virginia (1940)
Howl (2010)
Howl's Moving Castle (2004)
Howling series:
The Howling (1981)
Howling II: Your Sister Is a Werewolf (1985)
Howling III (1987)
Howling IV: The Original Nightmare (1988)
Howling V: The Rebirth (1989)
Howling VI: The Freaks (1991)
The Howling: New Moon Rising (1995)
The Howling: Reborn (2011)
Hôtel Terminus: The Life and Times of Klaus Barbie (1988)
Hōzuki-san Chi no Aneki (2014)

Hu

Hua Yang De Nian Hua (2000)
Hubička (1911)
Hubie Halloween (2020)
Huckleberry Finn: (1920, 1931, 1974 & 1975 TV)
Hud: (1963 & 1986)
Huda's Salon (2021)
Hudson Hawk (1991)
The Hudsucker Proxy (1994)
Hue and Cry (1947)
The Hugga Bunch (1985 TV)
Hugo (2011)
Hukkle (2002)
"Hukkunud Alpinisti" hotell (1979)
Hula (1927)
Hulk (2003)
Hulk Vs (2008)
Hulk: Where Monsters Dwell (2016)
Hullabaloo (1940)
Hum Aapke Hain Koun..! (1994)
Hum Dil De Chuke Sanam (1999)
Hum Tum (2004)
Hum Tumhare Hain Sanam (2002)
The Human Centipede series:
The Human Centipede (First Sequence) (2010)
The Human Centipede 2 (Full Sequence) (2011)
The Human Centipede 3 (Final Sequence) (2015)
The Human Condition series:
The Human Condition I: No Greater Love (1959)
The Human Condition II: Road to Eternity (1959)
The Human Condition III: A Soldier's Prayer (1961)
Human Desire: (1919 & 1954)
Human Desires (1924)
Human Highway (1982)
Human Nature: (2001 & 2019)
Human Remains (1998)
The Human Stain (2003)
The Human Tornado (1976)
Human Traffic (2000)
 Human Traces (2017)
The Human Voice (2020)
Humanity and Paper Balloons (1937)
Humanoids from the Deep: (1980 & 1996)
The Humans (2021)
The Humbling (2014)
Humdrum (1998)
Humor Risk (1921)
Humoresque: (1920 & 1946)
Humorous Phases of Funny Faces (1906)
The Humpbacked Horse: (1941 & 1947)
Humpday (2009)
The Hunchback: (1914 & 1997 TV)
The Hunchback of Notre Dame: (1911, 1923, 1939, 1956, 1976 TV, 1982 TV, 1986 & 1996)
The Hunchback of Notre Dame II (2002)
The Hundred-Year-Old Man Who Climbed Out of the Window and Disappeared (2013)
Hungarian Rhapsody: (1928, 1954 & 1979)
The Hunger: (1983 & 1986)
Hunger: (1966, 1973, 2001, 2008 & 2009)
The Hunger Games series:
The Hunger Games (2012)
The Hunger Games: Catching Fire (2013)
The Hunger Games: Mockingjay – Part 1 (2014)
The Hunger Games: Mockingjay – Part 2 (2015)
 Hungerford (2014)
Hunk (1987)
The Hunt: (1963, 1966, 2007, 2012, 2016 & 2020)
The Hunt for Gollum (2009)
The Hunt for Red October (1990)
Hunt for the Wilderpeople (2016)
The Hunted: (1948, 1995, 2003, 2013 & 2015)
Hunted: (1952 & 2020)
Hunter (1973)
The Hunter: (1980, 2010, 2011 Russian & 2011 Australian)
Hunter Hunter (2020)
Hunter × Hunter series:
Hunter × Hunter: Phantom Rouge (2013)
Hunter × Hunter: The Last Mission (2013)
The Hunter's Cross (1954)
Hunterrr (2015)
Hunters Are for Killing (1970 TV)
Hunting (1991)
Hunting Humans (2002)
The Hunting Party: (1971 & 2007)
The Hunting of the President (2004)
The Huntsman: Winter's War (2016)
Hurlevent (1985)
Hurlyburly (1998)
The Hurricane: (1937 & 1999)
Hurricane Heist (2018)
Hurricane Streets
Hurry Sundown (1967)
The Hurt Locker (2008)
The Husband (2013)
Husbands (1970)
Husbands and Wives (1992)
Hush: (1998, 2008, 2013 & 2016)
Hush...Hush, Sweet Charlotte (1964)
Husk (2010)
Hussar Ballad (1962)
Hustle: (1975, 2004 TV & 2022)
The Hustle (2019)
Hustle & Flow (2005)
The Hustler: (1920 & 1961)
Hustlers (2019)

Hv-Hy

Hvad vil De ha'? (1956)
Hvězda zvaná Pelyněk (1964)
Hvis lille pige er du? (1963)
Hwasango (2001)
Hwayi: A Monster Boy (2013)
Hwerow Hweg (2002)
Hybrid: (1997 & 2007)
The Hybrid (2014)
Hybrids: (2015 & 2017)
Hyde and Go Tweet (1960)
Hyde and Hare (1955)
Hyde Park (1934)
Hyde Park Corner (1935)
Hyde Park on Hudson (2012)
Hyderabad Blues (1998)
Hyderabad Blues 2 (2004)
Hydra (2009 TV)
Hyena (2014)
The Hyena of London (1964)
Hyena Road (2015)
Hyenas: (1992 & 2011)
Hyménée (1947)
The Hymn of Leuthen (1933)
Hymn of the Nations (1944)
Hymn to a Tired Man (1968)
Hyouka: Forbidden Secrets (2017)
Hype! (1996)
Hyper: (2016 & 2018)
Hyper Sapien: People from Another Star (1986)
The Hyperboloid of Engineer Garin (1965)
Hyperspace (1984)
The Hyperwomen (2012)
Hypnotic (2021)
Hypnosis (1920)
Hypnotic Hick (1953)
The Hypnotist: (1940, 1957 & 2012)
Hypnotist's Revenge (1908)
A Hypnotist at Work (1897)
Hypnotized: (1910 & 1932)
Hypocrite (1949)
Hypocrites (1915)
Hypothermia (2012)
The Hypothesis of the Stolen Painting (1978)
Hyppolit, the Butler (1931)
Hysteria: (1965 & 2011)
Hysterical (1983)
Hysterical Blindness (2002 TV)
Hysterical History (1953)
Hysterical Psycho (2009)

Previous:  List of films: G    Next:  List of films: I

See also

 Lists of films
 Lists of actors
 List of film and television directors
 List of documentary films
 List of film production companies

-